Reginald Richardson (6 October 1922 – 2 July 2003) was an Australian cricketer. He played four first-class matches for Tasmania between 1948 and 1952.

See also
 List of Tasmanian representative cricketers

References

External links
 

1922 births
2003 deaths
Australian cricketers
Tasmania cricketers
Cricketers from Hobart